Catherine Amanda Badocco Helene de Oliveira (born 6 January 1987 in Paris, France) is a female water polo player from Brazil, who finished in fourth place with the Brazil women's national water polo team at the 2007 Pan American Games in Rio de Janeiro, Brazil.

Oliveira also competed at the 2007 World Aquatics Championships, finishing in tenth place. Her twin sister and goalkeeper Tess played in the same team.

References

External links
 
 
 Profile 

1987 births
Living people
Water polo players from Paris
People with acquired Brazilian citizenship
Brazilian female water polo players
Brazilian twins
Water polo players from São Paulo
Twin sportspeople
Water polo players at the 2011 Pan American Games
Pan American Games bronze medalists for Brazil
Olympic water polo players of Brazil
Water polo players at the 2016 Summer Olympics
Pan American Games medalists in water polo
Water polo players at the 2015 Pan American Games
Medalists at the 2011 Pan American Games
Medalists at the 2015 Pan American Games